Pseudodolbina fo, the acanthus hawkmoth, is a moth of the family Sphingidae. It is found from Nepal, Bhutan and north-eastern India into Tibet.

The wingspan is 60–68 mm. There is one generation per year.

The larvae have been recorded feeding on Strobilanthes alatus and Strobilanthes dalhousianus in north-eastern India.

Subspecies
Pseudodolbina fo fo (Nepal, Bhutan and north-eastern India into Tibet, China)
Pseudodolbina fo celator Jordan, 1926 (India)

References

Sphingini
Moths described in 1856